Ženski košarkaški klub Art Basket, commonly referred to as ŽKK Art Basket, is a women's professional basketball club based in Belgrade, Serbia.

History
The club was founded in 2009 in Belgrade at the Vladislav Ribnikar Elementary School by Ana Mrkić, a basketball coach and former player from Šabac. She started Art Basket as a youth system academy with the desire to be a farm team for Crvena zvezda. After years of working with girls, the club formed a senior basketball team in 2017. At that point a cooperation with men's club Mega Basket was established.

In March 2021, the club won its first title, the National Cup.

Head coaches
  Milan Vidosavljević (2019–present)

Trophies and awards

Trophies 
First League of Serbia
Runners-up (1) : 2020–21

Serbian Cup
Winner (1): 2021
Runners-up (1) : 2022

Season by season

Source: Srbijasport

See also
 List of basketball clubs in Serbia by major honours won

References

External links
 
 Profile at eurobasket.com
 Profile at srbijasport.net

Art Basket 
Basketball teams in Belgrade
Basketball teams established in 2009
2009 establishments in Serbia
KK Mega Basket